Sartana in the Valley of Death (also known as Ballad of Death Valley) is a 1970 Italian Spaghetti Western film written and directed by Roberto Mauri and starring William Berger.

Plot

Cast 

 William Berger as Lee Calloway aka Sartana
 Wayde Preston as Anthony Douglas 
  Aldo Berti as  George Douglas 
  Carlo Giordana as  Slim Douglas 
 Franco De Rosa as  Peter Douglas 
 Luciano Pigozzi as  Paco 
  Jolanda Modio as  Juanita 
  Pamela Tudor as Esther 
 Federico Boido as  Slim Craig
  Josiane Tanzilli as  Carmencita   
 Franco Ressel as  Norton

References

External links

Spaghetti Western films
1970 Western (genre) films
1970 films
Films directed by Roberto Mauri
1970s Italian films